Penybryn is a small village situated near Gelligaer in the County Borough of Caerphilly, Wales.

Villages in Caerphilly County Borough